The 1798 Delaware gubernatorial election was held on October 2, 1798.

Acting Governor Daniel Rogers was not eligible for re-election under the Delaware Constitution of 1792. 

Federalist nominee Richard Bassett defeated Democratic-Republican nominee David Hall and Federalist nominee Barclay Townsend with 52.50% of the vote.

General election

Results

References

Bibliography
 
 
 

1798
Delaware
Gubernatorial